Kildoagh is a townland in the civil parish of Templeport, County Cavan, Ireland. It lies in the Roman Catholic parish of Templeport and barony of Tullyhaw.

Geography

Kildoagh is bounded on the north by Kilsob and Muinaghan townlands, on the west by Mullaghmore, Templeport townland, on the south by Corboy Glebe townland and on the east by Port, Templeport townland. Its chief geographical features are Bellaboy Lough (Irish = Loch Béal Átha Buí = The Lake of the Entrance to the Yellow Ford), Templeport Lough, streams, spring wells and dug wells. Kildoagh is traversed by minor roads and rural lanes. The townland covers 179 statute acres.

History

In medieval times the McGovern barony of Tullyhaw was divided into economic taxation areas called ballibetoes, from the Irish Baile Biataigh (Anglicized as 'Ballybetagh'), meaning 'A Provisioner's Town or Settlement'. The original purpose was to enable the farmer, who controlled the baile, to provide hospitality for those who needed it, such as poor people and travellers. The ballybetagh was further divided into townlands farmed by individual families who paid a tribute or tax to the head of the ballybetagh, who in turn paid a similar tribute to the clan chief. The steward of the ballybetagh would have been the secular equivalent of the erenagh in charge of church lands. There were seven ballibetoes in the parish of Templeport. Kildoagh was located in the ballybetagh of Bally Gortnekargie (Irish Baile Gort na Carraige, meaning 'The Town of Rock Field').

The 1609 Ulster Plantation Baronial Map depicts the townland as Kildough.

The 1652 Commonwealth Survey spells the name as Kildogh.

The 1665 Down Survey map depicts it as Kildough.

William Petty's 1685 map depicts it as Killdough.

In the Plantation of Ulster by grant dated 27 February 1610, King James VI and I granted the two polls of Kildough containing 100 acres to Cahir McOwen O'Reily, gentleman, at an annual rent of £1-1s-4d. The said Cathaoir O'Reilly was the nephew of two chiefs of the O'Reilly clan- Aodh Connallach mac Maolmhordha who was chief from 1565–1583 and Eamonn mac Maolmhordha who was chief from 1596–1601. He was also a brother of Cathal O'Reilly who received lands in Bellaleenan townland and first cousin of Donill Backagh McShane O'Reyly who was simultaneously granted lands in Burren (townland).

In the Irish Rebellion of 1641 Eleanor Reynolds of Lissanore made a deposition about the rebellion in Kildoagh as follows-

The aforesaid Gillernoo mc Gowran (Irish = Giolla na Naomh Mág Samhradháin) was the brother of Brian Magauran who was chief of the McGovern Clan from 1622 until his death, and uncle of the next chief Charles Magauran who held the chieftainship during the rebellion from 1641 to 1657. Gillernoo signed his name as Gillernew Mc Gauranes on a 'Petition of the inhabitants of Cavan to the lord deputy and council, 8 July 1629'. He is mentioned several times in witness statements about the rebellion (see Charles Magauran for same).

The aforesaid Hugh McManus Óg McGovern was the great-grandson of Tomás mac Maghnus Mág Samhradháin who was chief of the McGovern Clan from 1512-1532. In the Ulster Plantation he received a grant of lands in Bofealan, Drumane and Crossmakelagher.

The O'Reilly lands in Kildoagh were confiscated in the Cromwellian Act for the Settlement of Ireland 1652 and were distributed as follows-

The 1652 Commonwealth Survey lists the proprietor as Mr Henry Pigott, who also appears as owner of other townlands in the same survey.

In the Hearth Money Rolls compiled on 29 September 1663 there was one person paying the Hearth Tax in- Kildough- Richard Pratt.

A grant dated 30 January 1668 from King Charles II of England to Richard Pyett included, inter alia, lands of Killduffe containing 2 cartrons of 221 acres.

A deed dated 24 December 1720 between Morley Saunders and John Enery includes the lands of Killdough.

A deed dated 13 Nov 1738 includes: the Topps of Killdough.

A lease dated 10 December 1774 from William Crookshank to John Enery of Bawnboy includes the lands of Killdough, as does a further deed by John Enery dated 13 December 1774.

The 1790 Cavan Carvaghs list spells the name as Kildoagh.

When the Roman Catholic church in Port, Templeport was seized by the English Crown in 1590 as part of the Reformation in Ireland, the Catholics first held Mass during the Penal Laws (Ireland) at a Mass rock in Drumlougher townland and later, when the enforcement of the laws were relaxed, a Barn Church of the Holy Trinity was erected in 1796 in Kildoagh and closed on 19 August 1979 when a new church was opened in the neighbouring townland of Kilsob to the north.

A lease dated 17 September 1816 John Enery of Bawnboy includes Kildough.

The Tithe Applotment Books for 1827 list eighteen tithepayers in the townland.

The Kildoagh Valuation Office Field books are available for November 1839.

Griffith's Valuation of 1857 lists twenty seven landholders in the townland.

Census

In the 1901 census of Ireland, there are eighteen families listed in the townland,
 and in the 1911 census of Ireland there are only fourteen families listed in the townland.

Antiquities

The only structure of historical interest in the townland seem to be the disused Holy Trinity Roman Catholic Church which is a very rare preserved example of an 18th-century Barn Church.Holy Trinity Church, Barn Church, Kildoagh Holy Trinity Roman Catholic Church, KILDOAGH, County Cavan Holy Trinity Church, Kildoagh - The National Trust for Ireland - An Taisce

References

External links
The IreAtlas Townland Data Base

Townlands of County Cavan